The splitfin flashlightfish or two-fin flashlightfish (Anomalops katoptron) is a species of beryciform fish in the family Anomalopidae. It is found in warm waters in the central and western Pacific Ocean near shallow reefs  in depth. It can grow to a length of  TL. It is the only known member of its genus.

Description
The splitfin flashlightfish is characterized by two bean shaped torch-like organs under its eyes containing bioluminescent bacteria, which the fish can turn on and off by blinking. The light organs are embedded in suborbital cavities and are connected at the anterior edge via a cartilaginous rod like attachment. The suborbital light organs are densely settled with luminous symbiotic bacteria that grow in tubular structures and produce a constant bluish light. Its body is black with a blue tinge along the dorsal and caudal fins. Adults can reach up to   TL in length.

Distribution and habitat
Splitfin flashlightfish are found in the western and central Pacific Ocean from the Philippines and Indonesia east to the Tuamotus, north to Japan, and south to the Great Barrier Reef. It is generally found near drop-offs and caves  in depth, but will move into shallower waters during the winter months.

Biology and ecology
A nocturnal species, the splitfin flashlightfish avoids sunlight and seeks prey in dark areas. It feeds primarily on zooplankton. Individuals can be found in large schools during moonless nights in the shallow water of coral reefs and in the open surrounding water. Little is known about the function and purpose of the Morse code-like blinking patterns displayed by the fish, so a research team led by Jens Hellinger from Ruhr-University in Germany sought to investigate how this enigmatic fish uses bioluminescent illumination. They found that during darkness in nighttime, the flashlight fish blinks up to 90 blinks per minute, but when the flashlight fish detects its living planktonic prey, their light organs open for a longer period of time and blink five times less frequently than the absence of plankton. If starved, it slowly loses the ability to emit light.

In the aquarium
This fish can be found in the aquarium trade. It can be kept with other nocturnal fish, including pinecone fish, glasseye squirrelfish, and cardinalfish. This species requires plenty of hiding places and low lighting in the aquarium. Spawning of the related flashlightfish Photoblepharon palpebratum in an aquarium was observed by Meyer-Rochow in 1976.

References

External links
 
 

Anomalopidae
Taxa named by Pieter Bleeker 
Fish described in 1856
Fish of the Pacific Ocean